The Harlan and Hollingsworth Office Building is a historic office building located in Wilmington, New Castle County, Delaware. It was completed in 1912, and stands on the corner of West St. and the Wilmington Rail Viaduct.  It is a three-story, detached, rectangular brick-faced building with two small rear wings in the Colonial Revival style.  It features two large, decorated copper-faced bay windows projecting from each face of the right corner of the second story.

By 1910, existing office facilities at the Harlan Plant of Bethlehem Steel (formerly Harlan and Hollingsworth) had become inadequate, and work started on a new office building.  It survived the closing of the Harlan Plant in 1944, and once housed laboratories for Gates Engineering Company. The building was purchased by 100 South West Street Associates in 1991 and restored.

It was listed in the National Register of Historic Places in 1979.

See also
 Jackson and Sharp Company
 National Register of Historic Places listings in Wilmington, Delaware

References

External links

Commercial buildings on the National Register of Historic Places in Delaware
Colonial Revival architecture in Delaware
Commercial buildings completed in 1912
Buildings and structures in Wilmington, Delaware
Wilmington Riverfront
Office buildings in Delaware
Historic American Engineering Record in Delaware
1912 establishments in Delaware
National Register of Historic Places in Wilmington, Delaware